The National Distance Running Hall of Fame was established on July 11, 1998, to honor those who have contributed to the sport of distance running. Many of those who are inducted have achieved great success as runners, but some members are enshrined for their ability to bring fame and recognition to the sport of running.  Many of the individuals inducted into this prestigious Hall of Fame, are extremely influential in regard to the recognition and progress the American distance running has undergone throughout the years.
 
The National Distance Running Hall of Fame is located in Utica, New York, United States. Inside the Hall are pictures, videos and other memorabilia that provide the history of the sport through the eyes of both the runners and spectators. The city of Utica was selected to be the home of the running hall of fame because it hosts the annual Boilermaker Road Race—one of the largest 15km road races in the US.  The Boilermaker Road race attracts thousands of racers, and thousands of more spectators to the City of Utica, New York, making it the perfect place to be house the National Distance Running Hall of Fame. 

Track and field and distance running are sports that rely heavily upon sponsorship money and donations in order to have everything they need to compete at a high level.  Some years come up much shorter than other years in funding and donations, which can cause ripple effects throughout the whole sport.  No induction ceremonies occurred in 2004, 2007 and 2009. In 2007, it was due to the search for a new executive director, the 30th running of the Boilermaker Road Race, and construction to the Stanley Theater stage, which is where the ceremony takes place. In 2009, the struggling economy caused too few sponsors to donate money for the event.  

With the inclusion of Grete Waitz and Priscilla Welch, the membership is not limited to Americans.  Both athletes represented other countries internationally (coincidentally both in the 1984 Olympic Marathon, the first Olympic marathon for women), though they had an extensive running history in the United States.

Members

See also

RRCA Distance Running Hall of Fame
USATF Masters Hall of Fame

External links
National Distance Running Hall of Fame
2007 inductions suspended press release
2009 inductions cancelled to due struggling economy
2010 inductees announced
John J. Kelley Induction Speech - Transcript

Road running in the United States
Sport of athletics awards
Distance
Sports halls of fame
Sports museums in New York (state)
Museums in Oneida County, New York
Buildings and structures in Utica, New York
Awards established in 1998
1998 establishments in New York (state)